The UTVA-60 is a Yugoslavian light aircraft of the 1960s. First flying in 1959, it was built by UTVA for both the Yugoslavian armed forces and for civilian use.

Development and design
In 1959 the Yugoslav aircraft company UTVA designed and built a single-engined, high-winged light utility aircraft, the UTVA 56, with a prototype making the first flight on 22 April 1959. Testing was successful, but the aircraft was redesigned for production, with a more powerful Lycoming O-480 engine, and designated the UTVA-60.

The UTVA-60 is an all-metal, four-place, strut-braced high-wing monoplane. It is fitted with a fixed conventional undercarriage which uses cantilevered steel tube struts. Trailing-edge wing flaps are linked to the ailerons, drooping the ailerons when the flaps are lowered to reduce landing speed, while the agricultural version's wing was fitted with slots.

The UTVA-60 was used as the basis for the UTVA-65, a specialised agricultural aircraft, which used the wings, undercarriage and tail of the UTVA-60, but with a low-mounted wing. The UTVA-60 was replaced in production by the UTVA-66, a further improved version.

Operational history
As well as civil use, the UTVA-60 was used by the Yugoslav Air Force, who received about 35, using them until 1982, while Cambodia received four aircraft.

Variants
UTVA-56
Prototype, powered by a 194 kW (260 hp) Lycoming GO-435 engine.
UTVA-60-AT1
Basic four seat utility version.
UTVA-60-AT2
Dual control version.
UTVA-60-AG
Agricultural version.
UTVA-60-AM
Ambulance version.
UTVA-60H
Floatplane, powered by a 221 kW (296 kW) Lycoming GO-480-G1H6 engine.

Operators

Royal Cambodian Air Force

Croatian Air Force

Khmer Air Force

Republika Srpska Air Force
92nd Light Multi role Aircraft Squadron

Yugoslav Air Force
122nd Hydroplane Liaison Squadron (1964–1968)
Letalski center Maribor (civil operator) YU-CBA, accident 20.06.1982

Specifications (UTVA-60-AT1)

See also

Notes

References

Donald, David (ed.) The Encyclopedia of World Aircraft. Leicester, UK: Blitz Editions, 1997. .
Grandolini, Albert. "L'Aviation Royale Khmere: The first 15 years of Cambodian military aviation". Air Enthusiast, Thirty-seven, September–December 1988. Bromley, UK:Fine Scroll. . pp. 39–47 .
Sport and Business Flight, 25 September 1959, p. 305.
Taylor, John W. R. Jane's All The World's Aircraft 1965-66. London: Samson Low, Marston, 1965.
Mondey, David, Encyclopedia of The World's Commercial and Private Aircraft, Crescent Books, New York NY (1981), p. 241

External links

UTVA-60 (in Russian)

1950s Yugoslav civil utility aircraft
60
High-wing aircraft
Single-engined tractor aircraft
Aircraft first flown in 1959